Shafqat Ali Khan (born 17 June 1972) is a classical singer of the khyal vocal genre, from Pakistan, belonging to the Sham Chaurasia gharana.

The youngest son of Ustad Salamat Ali Khan, Shafqat began performing from the age of seven, when he appeared at the Lahore Music Festival at Lahore, Pakistan in 1979.

Shafqat Ali Khan is the custodian of a four hundred year legacy of classical music. A major Pakistani English language newspaper reportedly commented about him, "This line of musicians began with Mian Chand Ali Khan and Mian Suraj Ali Khan who used to quell the heart and soul of Mughal Emperor Akbar by singing for him."

Awards and recognition
Describing a performance by Shafqat Ali Khan, The New York Times wrote, "exuberant complications, in which melodic gestures join hand-waving and synchronized finger-pointing to form an eloquent symbiosis." Khan has received numerous awards including the Amir Khusro Award in 1986, a Ghanda Award from New Delhi University in 1995 and a gold medal from Faisalabad University in 2004.

Shafqat Ali Khan received the Pride of Performance Award by the President of Pakistan in 2009. In 2018, Shafqat Ali Khan has been selected as ambassador for peace by Universal Peace Federation held in Washington, D.C. In his message, Shafqat thanks to his fans and said that he has displayed the country's soft image and message of peace in the world through his music.

Career
Besides performing in India, Pakistan and Bangladesh, Shafqat Ali Khan has performed concerts throughout Europe and in the United States and Canada. His recording labels are HMV (UK), EMI (India), EMI (Pakistan), WaterLily Acoustics (USA), MegaSound (India) and Folk Heritage (Pakistan).

Shafqat Ali Khan feels that since classical music is not commercial, all classical singers and other persons related to classical music can not earn enough to make a decent living for themselves. So they should be given additional monthly support income by the Pakistani government. Shafqat ali khan has many students all over India and Pakistan. Shafqat Ali Khan has two sons, Faizan Ali Khan and Nadir Ali Khan, they are singing with their father in concerts these days.

References 

1972 births
Living people
Vocal gharanas
Pakistani ghazal singers
Pakistani classical singers
Recipients of the Pride of Performance
Pakistani musicians
Classical music in Pakistan
Pakistani classical musicians